The 23rd Infantry Regiment is an infantry regiment in the United States Army. A unit with the same name was formed on 26 June 1812 and saw action in 14 battles during the War of 1812.

In 1815 it was consolidated with the 6th, 16th, 22nd, and 32nd Regiments of Infantry into what is at present the 2nd Infantry Regiment.

The modern 23rd Infantry regiment was formed during the American Civil War; the regiment saw action in American wars up to the US War in Afghanistan and the Iraq War. It included a battalion of volunteers made up of active and reserve French military personnel who had been sent to the Korean Peninsula as part of the United Nations force fighting in the Korean War.

War of 1812

Twenty-five regiments of infantry were approved by Act of Congress on June 26, 1812. After the war in 1815, the 23rd was consolidated with the 6th, 16th, 22nd, and 32nd Regiments of Infantry into what is at present the 2nd Infantry Regiment which inherited its honors.

By reckoning at the time, there were 14 battles and engagements in which a part or the whole of the 23d Infantry was engaged during the War of 1812-15, which amounts to most of the battles of the Niagara Frontier Campaign. In particular, these include Queenston Heights on October 13, 1812; Black Rock, November 28, 1812; Fort George in Upper Canada, May 27, 1813; Defense of Sacketts Harbor, N. Y., 1813; Stony Creek, Upper Canada, June 6, 1813; Beaver Dams, Upper Canada, June 24, 1813; Fort Erie, Upper Canada, July 3, 1814; Chippewa, Upper Canada, July 5, 1814; Lundy's Lane (Niagara Falls), July 25, 1814; Siege of Fort Erie, Upper Canada, August 15 to September 17, 1814.

Korean War

Battle of Pusan Perimeter (4 August - 18 September 1950)

On June 25, 1950, the North Korean army invaded South Korea, beginning of the Korean War. By August 1950, the 23rd Infantry Regiment had deployed at the narrow valley called "Bowling Alley", which was near the city of Taegu in defense on the Pusan Perimeter and aid the South Korean troops in the battle.

Battle of Chipyong-ni (13-15 February 1951)

Chipyong-ni was defended because the commanding general of Eighth Army (Lieutenant General Matthew B. Ridgway) decided to make a stand there against the Chinese Communists.

In the chronology of Korean battles, the fighting for Chipyong-ni followed the withdrawal from northern Korea at the end of 1950, a brief Eighth Army offensive that began on 5 February 1951, and a full-scale Chinese counteroffensive that struck a week later.

The 23rd Regimental Combat Team made the decisive defense of Chipyong-ni on 13–14 February 1951. This action followed the patrol ambush and the subsequent Battle of the Twin Tunnels area some high ground three miles southeast of Chipyong-ni. After the Twin Tunnels operation, the 23rd Infantry Regiment (2nd Infantry Division) proceeded on the afternoon of 3 February to the town of Chipyong-ni and set up a perimeter defense. Chipyong-ni was a small crossroads town half a mile long and several blocks wide, situated on a single-track railroad. Besides the railway station there were several other brick or frame buildings in the center of the town, but most of the buildings were constructed of the usual mud, sticks, and straw. At least half of them were already reduced to rubble as the result of previous fighting in the town.

Encircling Chipyong-ni were eight prominent hills that rose to an average height of 850 feet above the rice paddies and buildings in the valley. These hills provided excellent defensive positions, but to have occupied them would have stretched the front-line defensive positions along 12 miles of ridgelines and formed a perimeter with a 3 to 4-mile diameter. Instead, the regimental commander (Colonel Paul L. Freeman), stationed his infantrymen on lower ground around a tight perimeter about a mile in diameter. On three sides of the town the line followed small hills; on the northwest section the infantrymen dug their holes across a half-mile strip of rice paddies.

During the ten days after going into position at Chipyong-ni, Col. Freeman's regiment dug in and strengthened its positions. The 37th Field Artillery Battalion (attached to the regiment), arrived on 5 February. Battery B, 82nd Antiaircraft Artillery Automatic Weapons Battalion, joined the regiment, adding six M16 and four M19 flakwagons to the defense of the town. Several days later Battery B, 503rd Field Artillery Battalion (a 155-mm howitzer unit), was attached to reinforce the 37th Field Artillery Battalion.

The infantry companies dug in their machine guns, registered their mortars, laid antipersonnel mines, and operated daily patrols to the encompassing high ground. The regimental Heavy-Mortar Company divided the fire of its platoons and sections among the sectors of the perimeter, the artillery registered on all probable avenues of enemy approach and all units established good communication lines. There was time to coordinate the infantry, artillery and air support into an effective combat team.

Company G
The following narrative describes the fighting for Chipyong-ni that occurred in that sector of the 2nd Battalion's perimeter defended by Company G, 23rd Infantry. The howitzers of Battery B, 503rd Field Artillery Battalion, were in position at the bottom of Company G's hill so that the artillerymen were drawn into the same battle. The commander of the 2nd Battalion (Lt.Col. James W. Edwards) placed all three of his rifle companies on the front line to cover the sector assigned to his battalion. This was the southern rim of the perimeter. Within the companies, two company commanders committed their three rifle platoons. The other company (F), to which Col. Edwards assigned the center and smallest sector, manned its part of the line with only two platoons, leaving its support platoon as the battalion reserve.

The narrow supply road leading southwest from Chipyong-ni went under the railroad on the southern edge of the town and then, within a third of a mile, passed two embankments of red clay where the road cut through the two ends of a U-shaped hill. Company G started at the second of these two road cuts and extended left (east) along the southern side of the U. It was not much of a hill, only a couple of contour lines on the map. Infantrymen could climb the smooth hump of earth in a few minutes. The 1st Platoon of Company G held the right end of the hill next to the road cut. The 3rd Platoon had the center position (the highest part of the hill) and extended its line left to the bend of the U. The 2nd Platoon was down in the rice paddies between the 3rd Platoon and Company F.

Men from the two platoons on the hill dug their holes just over the top of the forward slope. The positions restricted the fields of fire somewhat but provided good observation, especially for the 3rd Platoon, which could see all areas to the south except for a dead spot in a dry creek bed just in front of its right flank.

There were two other significant features near the 3d Platoon's area.
At the foot of the hill and just beyond the dry creek bed was a cluster of 15 or 20 buildings that made up the village of Masan. The second feature was a narrow spur of ground that formed a link between the 3rd Platoon's hill and a large hill mass to the south. The 2nd Platoon in the rice paddies lacked satisfactory observation but had good fields of fire across the flat land to its immediate front.

In addition to its own Weapons Platoon, Company G's supporting weapons included a section of 75-mm recoilless rifles, a section of heavy machine guns from Company H, and a platoon of 81-mm mortars under command of Lt. James Whitaker which was dug in near the edge of the town and had a forward observer (Lt.Whitaker) stationed with Company G. There were also forward observers from the regimental Heavy-Mortar Company and from the 37th Field Artillery Battalion with Company G. During the daytime men from the 75-mm recoilless rifle section manned their weapons, but at night they replaced them with two .50 caliber machine guns to prevent having their positions disclosed by the back-blasts of the recoilless rifles.

The Ammunition and Pioneer Platoon set up two fougasses (drums of napalm), the first on the road just south of the road cut, the second in the rice paddies in front of the 2nd Platoon. The 1st Platoon, which was next to the road, also strung barbed-wire across the road and in front of its position. There was not enough wire available to reach across the company front. Colonel Edwards supervised the siting of all weapons, and the digging of the holes which he insisted be of the standing type and deep enough for good cover.

When Battery B, 503rd Field Artillery Battalion, arrived, its 155-mm howitzers went into position in the small bowl formed by the U-shaped ridge of which Company G occupied one side. The howitzers were laid by platoon to support the east, north and west sectors of the regimental perimeter. To the rear of the howitzers, the artillerymen set up a tent for the fire direction center (FDC) personnel. Behind that, near the bottom of Company G's hill, were several other tents for the mess and supply sections. A liaison officer from the 37th Field Artillery Battalion to Battery B (Captain John A. Elledge), and the commander of Company G (Lieutenant Thomas Heath) worked out a plan for the joint defense of the sector. This plan provided for the use of the artillery's machine guns in the front line and, if necessary, the use of some artillerymen as riflemen while skeleton crews manned the howitzers. The two officers also set up an infantry-artillery machine-gun post in the road cut with a six-man crew to operate two weapons, one .50 caliber and one .30 caliber. This road cut was also the dividing line between Col. Edwards's 2nd Battalion sector and that of the French battalion (a regular battalion of the 23rd Infantry).

Offensive and counter-offensive
While the 23rd RCT built up its defenses, an Eighth Army general offensive got under way on 5 February with X Corps, in the center of the line, attacking to make a double envelopment of the town of Hongch'on, an important enemy build-up area. The attack moved slowly until the night of 11 February, when the Chinese launched a full-scale counteroffensive with two columns driving south, aimed at the towns of Hoengseong and Wonju in X Corps' sector. The vigorous enemy attack drove through two ROK divisions and turned the United Nations' attack into a withdrawal that rolled the front lines south between 5 and 20 miles. Before the Chinese attack, the front lines of X Corps were well ahead of Col. Freeman's Chipyong-ni perimeter, but as the units went south, sometimes fighting through enemy roadblocks, Chipyong-ni became a conspicuous bulge on the left of the corps' line. Eventually the bulge was cut off from X Corps and the 23rd was completely surrounded.

Day 1 of the battle

At the 23rd Infantry's perimeter, the usual patrols for the daylight hours of 13 February reported increased enemy activity crowding close to Chipyong-ni on three sides, north, east and west. The Air Force observation plane operating with the RCT reported enemy groups moving toward the perimeter from the north and east. Observers called for artillery fire against those enemy columns within reach, while the tactical air control party directed forty flights of aircraft against other enemy groups beyond artillery range.  Beginning about 22:00, the Chinese launched a series of probes and attacks designed to locate and drive the 23rd Infantry out of their defensive positions. These ceased shortly after sunrise due to the threat of American air control.

Day 2 of the battle

The Americans were low on ammunition by the second day in addition to having suffered about 100 casualties.  Air support kept the Chinese from attacking during daylight hours on the 14th. At dusk the Chinese resumed their artillery attack followed shortly afterward by ground attacks. A fierce prolonged battle ensued with the forces on the south side being forced out of position. The battle on the south side continued all day on the 15th even in the face of American close air support. The Chinese were determined to destroy the 23rd to allow them to continue to force the X Corps south. Late in the afternoon, the Chinese were forced back outside of the defensive positions. Elements of the 5th Cavalry Regiment (Task Force Crombez) with tank support arrived as the fight was ending with the Chinese withdrawing.

Aftermath

The Chinese failure to eliminate the 23rd at Chipyong-ni effectively ended the Chinese effort to drive the American forces into the sea. UN casualties were 51 killed, 250 wounded, and 42 missing. The Chinese had lost about 2,000 killed and suffered about 3,000 wounded. The effect on the Eighth Army was tremendous. Shortly afterward the UN launched Operation Killer and then Operation Ripper which forced the Chinese back to the north.  The result was the start of peace negotiations in July 1951.

Heartbreak Ridge (13 September - 15 October 1951)

After withdrawing from Bloody Ridge, the Korean People's Army (KPA) set up new positions just 1,500 yards (1,400 m) away on a seven-mile (11 km) long hill mass. If anything, the Communist defenses were even more formidable here than on Bloody Ridge. The U.S. 2nd Infantry Division's acting commander, Brigadier General Thomas de Shazo and his immediate superior, Major General Clovis E. Byers, the X Corps commander, seriously underestimated the strength of the North Korean position. They ordered a single infantry regiment—the 23rd—and its attached French battalion to make what would prove to be an ill-conceived assault straight up Heartbreak's heavily fortified slopes.

All three of the 2nd Division's infantry regiments participated, with the brunt of the combat borne by the 23rd and 9th Infantry Regiments, along with the attached French battalion. The attack began on 13 September and quickly deteriorated into a familiar pattern. First, American aircraft, tanks and artillery would pummel the ridge for hours, turning the already barren hillside into a cratered moonscape. Next, the 23rd's infantrymen would clamber up the mountain's rocky slopes, taking out one enemy bunker after another by direct assault. Those who survived to reach the crest arrived exhausted and low on ammunition. The North Koreans counterattacked repeatedly. Many of these counterattacks were conducted at night by fresh troops that the North Koreans were able to bring up in the shelter of neighboring hills.

The battle progressed for two weeks. Because of the constricting terrain and the narrow confines of the objectives, units were committed piecemeal to the fray, one platoon, company, or battalion at a time. Once a particular element had been so ground-up that it could no longer stand the strain, a fresh unit would take its place, until the 23rd Infantry as a whole was fairly well shattered.

The fighting was savage and the ridgeline (called Heartbreak by the American infantrymen) changed hands many times in an exhausting series of attacks and counterattacks. Several units up to company size (100-200 men) were wiped out. The Americans employed massive artillery barrages, airstrikes and tanks in an attempt to drive the North Koreans off the ridge, but the KPA proved extremely hard to dislodge.

Finally, on 27 September, the 2nd Division's new commander, Major General Robert N. Young, called a halt to the "fiasco" on Heartbreak Ridge as American planners reconsidered their strategy.

As long as the North Koreans could continue to reinforce and resupply their garrison on the ridge, it would be nearly impossible for the Americans to take and hold the mountain. After belatedly recognizing this fact, the 2nd Division crafted a new plan that called for a full divisional assault on the valleys and hills adjacent to Heartbreak Ridge to cut the position off from further reinforcement. Spearheading this new offensive was the division's 72nd Tank Battalion, whose mission was to push up the Mundung-ni Valley west of Heartbreak Ridge, destroying enemy supply dumps in the vicinity of the town of Mundung-ni.

It was a bold plan, but one that could not be accomplished until a way had been found to get the 72nd's M4A3E8 Sherman tanks into the valley. The only existing road was little more than a track that could not bear the weight of the Shermans. Moreover, it was heavily mined and blocked by a six-foot (2 m) high rock barrier built by the North Koreans. The 2nd Division's 2nd Combat Engineer Battalion braved enemy fire to clear this obstacle and build an improved roadway. While they worked, the division's three infantry regiments—9th, 38th and 23rd—launched coordinated assaults on Heartbreak Ridge and the adjacent hills. On 10 October the sudden onslaught of a battalion of tanks racing up the valley took the enemy by surprise. By coincidence, the thrust came just when the Chinese 204th Division was moving up to relieve the North Koreans on Heartbreak Ridge. Caught in the open, the Chinese division suffered heavy casualties from the American tanks. For the next five days the Shermans roared up and down the Mundung-ni Valley, over-running supply dumps, mauling troop concentrations and destroying approximately 350 bunkers on Heartbreak Ridge and in the surrounding hills and valleys. A smaller tank-infantry team scoured the Sat'ae-ri Valley east of the ridge, thereby completing the encirclement and eliminating any hope of reinforcement for the North Koreans on Heartbreak.

The armored thrusts turned the tide of the battle, but hard fighting remained for the infantry before French soldiers captured the last communist bastion on the ridge on 13 October. After 30 days of combat, the Americans and French eventually secured Heartbreak Ridge.

Both sides suffered high casualties: over 3,700 American and French and an estimated 25,000 North Korean and Chinese. The U.N. and U.S. command, which decided that battles like Heartbreak Ridge were not worth the high cost in blood for the relatively small amount of terrain captured. For this reason, Heartbreak Ridge was the last major offensive conducted by U.N. forces in the war.

Sporadic battles along the line of contact between U.N. and communist forces continued to be fought until the armistice was signed in July 1953, but they were usually initiated by the North Koreans or Chinese.

Re-designation of 1st Battalion, 23rd Infantry Regiment
The unit derived from the 4th Battalion, 8th Infantry Regiment, 1st Armored Division, which served in Mannheim, Germany until the unit was sent, along with the rest of the brigade, to Fort Lewis, Washington, in the summer of 1994. That fall, the battalion was reflagged as the 1st Battalion, 23rd Infantry Regiment, 2nd Infantry Division.

Vietnam service

On 17 December 1965, the 4th Battalion (Mechanized) 23rd Infantry Regiment was alerted for overseas deployment and on 22 January 1966 it became part of the 25th Infantry Division (Tropic Lightning). After approximately 84 days of rigorous and intensive jungle training in the tropics of Hawaii, the 4/23rd boarded the USS Walker on 15 April 1966. The Walker sailed at 0200 the following day and arrived in Vung Tau, Republic of Vietnam after 14 days of calm sailing. The Battalion boarded landing craft and once ashore on the morning of 29 April, moved out for Cu Chi where they were to take up defensive positions and conduct combat operations.

On 9 May the 4/23rd participated in its first major operation against the Viet Cong. “Operation Akron” lasted for three days and the “Tomahawks” made a good showing their first time out in the field.

Following this operation, the 4/23rd returned to Cu Chi base camp to continue making improvements in their area. “Operation Wahiawa” began on 16 May 1966 and saw the Battalion operating in the Filhol Plantation area along with elements of the First Brigade. This operation lasted for 13 hard days, in which the Battalion moved through the plantation searching for the Viet Cong. Following this, “Operation Makiki” was launched on 3 June 1966 and the 4/23rd found itself in the thick of it when it ended on 7 June.

The 4/23rd moved to Bien Hoa in mid-June to secure the base camps of the 1st Infantry Division and those of the 173d Airborne Brigade. Company-sized operations and patrol actions were conducted during the operations at Bien Hoa. On 15 July the 4/23rd was flown by C-123 aircraft to Vo Dat for the start of “Operation Kahana II”, during which numerous company-sized operations were undertaken in both the Vo Dat and Vo Xu areas. Alpha Company distinguished itself while taking part in a search and destroy mission in the hamlet of Vo Xu. Unknown to anyone, the Viet Cong had prepared an ambush for the district chief of Vo Dat, but Alpha’s presence thwarted the attempt and resulted in 2 VC KIA.

The New Life Hamlet at Vo Xu was built up and Medcaps were regularly undertaken within the immediate area. It was during these operations that the 4/23rd made its first contacts with the Montagnard tribe and was duly impressed with both their attitude and perseverance. From Vo Dat, the 4/23rd was moved back to base camp and began preparations for the move to Tay Ninh for the upcoming “Operation Oahu”.

The mission of the Battalion was to secure the base camp of the 196th Light Infantry Brigade which was just then arriving from the United States. The entire month of August found the 4/23rd occupying the Tay Ninh perimeter and conducting constant search and destroy operations in the vicinity. With the 196th Brigade firmly entrenched, the Battalion found itself released from their present duties and reassigned to the 1st Infantry Division and flown out to Lai Khe to secure yet another perimeter. This time, it was for the 1st Brigade, 1st Infantry Division and was the first big night move for the Battalion. Using Army Caribous and Air Force C-123s the Battalion was swiftly deployed to Lai Khe and established itself on the perimeter. After 4 days of operations with the 1st Infantry Division, the 4/23rd was once again moved back to Cu Chi to begin preparations for “Operation Kipapa”.

This operation got underway with the 4/23rd moving through the southern tip of the Filhol Plantation to Bao Tran. Its mission was to secure a forward fire base and destroy the VC operation in that area.

The Bao Cap – Bao Tran areas had historically been VC guerrilla strongholds and it proved to be every bit as tough an obstacle as expected. Numerous bunker and tunnel complexes were located and destroyed by the Battalion. Once the perimeter had been established, company-sized search and destroy operations were carried out daily and large caches of weapons, documents and food were discovered and destroyed. With the operation nearly concluded, the 4/23rd was pulled out and returned to Cu Chi base camp; however Alpha Company left a platoon-sized ambush patrol behind and roughly 3 hours after getting into position on 12 September, the platoon accounted for 1 VC KIA and 2 WIA out of the 4 VC who walked into the old perimeter to search for abandoned materials.

During the month of September, the 4/23rd remained in Cu Chi and conducted company sweeps and search and destroy missions in the Filhol Plantation and the Phu Hoa Dong area.

The month of October began with the “Tomahawks” once again preparing for another operation … “Operation Kalihi”, which was to be conducted in the Ap Nhe Viec area. The Battalion moved on foot to just north of Paris Ton Qui and established a defensive perimeter on 10 October 1966. From this forward base, company sweeps were conducted daily and on one particular sweep near the Saigon River, Alpha Company was taken under fire by Viet Cong. Some helicopters being used in the operation were downed by the intense ground fire and during the long night, with flareships orbiting overhead to illuminate the area, the men of Alpha maintained a secure perimeter around the downed ships. The following morning the disabled craft and the men of Alpha were safely extracted. The end of October saw the end of “Operation Kalihi” and the 4/23rd found itself immediately alerted for deployment to the Delta to relieve the 4th Battalion, 9th Infantry Regiment at Ben Luc.

A very important pacification program had been successfully begun by the 4/9th “Manchus”, who were now due for rotation back to Cu Chi. On 5 November, the 4/23rd left Cu Chi and effected this relief. Operations began immediately with combinations of new pacification programs and security missions in the area. Since the 4/23rd was only the second major unit to have operated in the Delta, it was deemed very important to maintain good relations with the local populace. This resulted in extensive search and clear operations, Medcap and general pacification programs being conducted throughout the month of November.

The year 1967 brought a major and revolutionary change to the “Tomahawks” and to the 25th Infantry Division. Having had previous experience as a mechanized unit during its service in Alaska, the 4/23rd was chosen to be the first unit to make the “Mech switch”. It was felt that with just slight refresher training, the battalion could easily be returned to a mechanized infantry unit.

Ninety-three armored personnel carriers were scheduled to arrive in Cu Chi by the new year and the “Tomahawks” had to begin preparation for the changeover immediately so that mechanized operations could begin without delay. Dump trucks, tractors and scores of men from the 65th Engineer Battalion cleared the area, dumped and paved hard layers of dirt throughout the selected tract of land which was to become the new motor pool. Drivers for the new tracks began their training, wheeled vehicles were turned in and infantrymen were oriented on mechanized infantry tactics. All the officers and men of the command anxiously awaited the arrival of their new equipment.

In mid-January the “Tomahawks” were finally ready to continue their missions for the 25th Infantry Division. Speaking on the transition, Lieutenant Colonel Louis J. North, former 4/23rd commander, commented that the change over would “enhance the mobility and shock action of the battalion. It will simplify the problems of going into heavily booby-trapped areas and give us the ability to close in on the enemy faster and with greater fire power.”

Their first real test came on Operation Ala Moana, a search and destroy mission, conducted at Duc Lap for five days in late January, 1967. The “Tomahawks” proved their flexibility as they accounted for a VC KIA (BC), 4 VC KIA (possible), 4 VC POW and 55 detainees. They also destroyed numerous bunkers, fox holes and tunnels in addition to the capture of 1,800 pounds of rice.

During the month of February 1967, the “Tomahawks” participated in Operation Gadsden, a multi-brigade search and destroy/blocking operation conducted in Tay Ninh Province along the Cambodian border. The operation was designed to expose and deny the Viet Cong access to their infiltration and exfiltration routes along the border adjacent to War Zone C. The Recon Platoon was significant in this operation, having located a small ammo and medical cache and documents referring to a local VC Finance and Economy Agency. The area of operations for the “Tomahawks” was heavily infested with VC training and staging areas, many of which were destroyed by the new and powerful mechanized 4/23rd.

On 22 February 1967, the “Tomahawks” helped kick off the largest single operation up to that time … “Operation Junction City”. They set up a base camp approximately 15 kilometers northwest of Nui Ba Den (the Black Virgin Mountain). The 4th Battalion (Mech), 23rd Infantry was cited for its courage and valor and was instrumental in the end result of “Junction City”. A total of 947 VC were killed, 18 POW taken and 183 “Hoi Chanhs” rallied to the side of the South Vietnamese government during the 84 day operation.

“Operation Manhattan”, conducted between 23 April and 7 June, was yet another multi-brigade search and destroy operation, the purpose of which was the location and destruction of Viet Cong forces in the Boi Loi/Ben Cui area. A secondary mission was the location and destruction of VC facilities and fortified positions in the Boi Loi Woods.

Intelligence reports indicated that the area of operation contained numerous important enemy base camps which were being used for logistical and command purposes. There were also indications that one complete VC battalion and part of another were operating in the area.

The Boi Loi Woods was characterized by heavy secondary forest and dense undergrowth, with some areas of wetland rice paddies and a large area of non-producing rubber plantation.

“Operation Manhattan” began on 23 April when the 4/23rd moved in to secure LZs (Landing Zones) for the 4/9th and 2/14th Infantry.

On the morning of 29 April, Bravo Company, 4/23rd was hit by a large VC force. The enemy employed small arms, mortars and rifle grenades in their attack. The infantrymen returned the enemy fire with small arms, automatic weapons and artillery. As the battle continued, the guerrillas fired on the unit with RPG-2 rockets, but only one APC was hit. Close support airstrikes were then called in and after 2 hours of intense fighting, the VC broke contact and withdrew, taking with them their killed and wounded.

During the next few days, the “Tomahawks” provided security for the engineer units employed in jungle clearing operations. Starting on 11 May, the main focus of attention was directed at the 65th Engineers’ Land Clearing Team (LCT). Thirty “Rome Plows” hacked away at the dense undergrowth and tangle of trees in the very heart of the Boi Loi Woods. The mission of the 4/23rd now shifted to one of providing security for the LCT, with continued local search and destroy operations and ambush patrols still being conducted. The 65th Engineers secondary role was that of upgrading and improving roads throughout the operational area.

Between 16 May and 6 June, 4/23rd elements continued to provide security and undertook further local search and destroy operations. On 22 May the Battalion began a 5-day operation in which they inserted and extracted Popular Force Reconnaissance units, while conducting combined search and destroy and night ambush patrols with their allies. On 28 May the “Tomahawks” ended this special operation and relocated back to the 65th Engineers and the previous security operations. June 7 saw the 4/23rd returning to the Cu Chi base camp and at 2400 hours, “Operation Manhattan” was concluded.

During the period of 21 June 1967 to 3 February 1968, the 4/23rd was again engaged in security detail for yet another series of Land Clearing Operations, this time in the Filhol Plantation, Hobo Woods and the Iron Triangle. The purpose of this clearing operation was to eliminate the dense, existing vegetation so as to deny cover to VC/NVA units operating in these historic strongholds.

On 19 September 1967 the 27th Land Clearing Detachment was placed OPCON to the Battalion and so remained until 3 February 1968.

The mission of clearing the vast areas of the Filhol, Hobo Woods and Iron Triangle was an enormous undertaking in land clearing alone since these areas consisted of 19,635 acres. However, the idea of conducting such an operation in an extremely hostile environment was disconcerting, to say the least! Since there were no guidelines established in conducting this type of operation, the Battalion had to, in effect, “write the book” while in the midst of the actual execution of the mission. The Battalion encountered three major obstacles during these operations: weather, terrain and the enemy. Each individually, and often in concert, would at times slow the Battalion’s progress. However, any and all obstacles were met and overcome as the clearing operations continued.

The additional operational considerations and logistical requirements needed to support this operation were massive. The Battalion was totally dependent on air resupply and evacuation. The amount of supplies having to be brought in reached into the millions of pounds. Such constant requirements greatly overburdened the support platoon. Notwithstanding the difficulties involved, supplies continued to arrive and this outstanding performance reflects most highly on the support unit personnel’s devotion to duty … all too often unmentioned by historians. Their faithful execution of their mission was critical in the overall success of the land clearing efforts.

Although normally considered a support-type mission connected with the engineers, the 4/23rd was assigned the task of clearing vast areas that had been VC strongholds for years. The Battalion was given a new unit with which to accomplish this task without benefit of a real doctrine of experience to go on and successfully developed effective concepts, and in spite of the many obstacles placed in the Battalion’s path, successfully accomplished the mission.

These land clearing operations were titled “Barking Sands” – the cutting of the area of the Hobo Woods generally north of Trang Bang; “Atlanta” – which leveled the once impregnable Iron Triangle; and finally “Saratoga” – which encompassed the Filhol Rubber Plantation and additional portions of the Hobo Woods.

While the Lunar New Year cease fire (3 days of Tet) was still in existence, the enemy deliberately broke the truce and launched the infamous “Tet Offensive”. Saigon and Tan Son Nhut were the main focal points of the attacks. Still in the Hobo Woods, the “Tomahawks” were immediately pulled out of operations and dispatched to these critical points. Elements of the Battalion were summoned to Saigon to help other U.S. and South Vietnamese units quell the precarious situation. “Operation Quyet Thang” (Resolve to Win) was underway ant the Battalion began slowly to push the VC and NVA units out of both Saigon and the surrounding countryside.

On the 13th and 14th of February 1968, the 4/23rd again proved its capability as a fighting unit. An estimated battalion of NVA had taken the village of Ap Cho which is situated on QL-1 just south of Cu Chi. They were well entrenched, with good overhead protection and amply supplied with both food a munitions. The ARVN compound directly adjacent to the highway was under their control … this was a main convoy resupply route. Initial contact with the enemy forces was made by the 3/22nd. Supported by both airstrikes and artillery, the 3/22nd fought fiercely for over 10 days, with only the smallest portion of the village being retaken. On the morning of the 13th, the 4/23rd reinforced the 3/22nd. With APCs deployed on-line, the “Tomahawks” began their push into Ap Cho. The advance was slow and hard as the enemy employed RPG-7 anti-armor rockets against the APCs from bunkers and spider holes. The NVA had been ordered to hold Ap Cho at all costs, but the “Tomahawks” were even more determined that the enemy would be dislodged. By the evening of the 13th, the 4/23rd had retaken as much as 1/3 of the village. All that night, artillery and mortars pounded the enemy still within the other 2/3 of Ap Cho. The morning of the 14th saw Divisional Artillery’s M-110, self-propelled 8-inch howitzers employed against bunker lines in a direct-fire role while Charlie Company spearheaded up the center, supported by the rest of the Battalion attacking the flanks. The result was a complete success, illustrating how a mechanized unit could be used effectively. The NVA forces were routed and Ap Cho was again a safe place in which to live and work. This portion of QL-1 was once again secured for resupply convoy operations.

In March, the Recon platoon was engaged in limited search and destroy operations as well as road sweeps between Cu Chi Base Camp and Trang Bang to the north on QL-1 and to Hoc Mon Bridge on QL-1 to the south. This was important in keeping the highway open for convoys, which had increased in both frequency and size as a direct result of the Tet Offensive. On 25 March 1968, the 2d section Recon Platoon HHC 4/23rd began its usual morning sweep from Cu Chi to Trang Bang, while the 1st section swept south to Hoc Mon Bridge. Each section consisted of 4 APCs (“Vipers”) and a small contingent of 7 men of the 65th Engineers. Alpha Company, with about 430 men, was operating in the area around Trang Bang Bridge, located approximately 1500 meters south from the village of Trang Bang on QL-1.

Shortly before 0800, the Recon section was about 1100 meters south of Alpha’s lines when they encountered one of five battalions of the 271st NVA Regiment. The apparent intent of the 271st NVA was to ambush Alpha Company, using the 5 battalions to encircle them and with 2500 men, wipe out the American unit. These overwhelming odds should have ensured that outcome.

The 2d Recon section of 19 men with 4 APCs were now blocking the way of this NVA battalion which was attempting to move across QL-1, cutting it to prevent reinforcements and closing the circle.

In a brief but very intense firefight, Recon found that its exposed position on the highway and small numbers would prevent any maneuvering. Still, they managed to inflict severe casualties on the enemy before the tide of battle turned against them. With odds of 26 to 1, the 2d section was fast facing the prospect of being completely overrun.

With 2 APCs already hit and out of action, of which one was burning, and a large number of wounded, the decision was made to remount the deployed members and break out to Alpha’s position near the bridge. With only 2 operational APCs, all troops within reach mounted and move out. Those not able to mount the APCs made their move toward Alpha in the far-side ditch. Covering that 1100 meters cost both APCs as they were subjected to intense fire from RPGs and recoilless rifles. Additional Recon members were wounded.

The battle raged for hours with artillery and airstrikes called in to break up the 271st’s attack. When the battle ended, the men of the 4/23rd had held their ground and were still an operational force. The 271st NVA Regiment was not. QL-1 was open as usual on March 26th, just as it had been on the 24th!

The 2d section Recon had lost 4 APCs and the vehicles of the contingent of 65th Engineers. They had suffered 6 KIA, 11 WIA. The awards presented for this action were: 1 Distinguished Service Cross, 6 Silver Stars, 10 Bronze Stars with “V” and 16 Purple Hearts. They were credited with 175 NVA killed and an uncounted number of enemy wounded.

Significant in the month of April was the Battalion’s contact with a well dug-in NVA battalion. Joined by the 3/39th ARVN Regiment, the “Tomahawks” fought fiercely for two days. Supported by artillery and tactical air strikes, the 4/23rd forced the NVA to break contact just outside of Duc Hoa. A sweep of the bloody battlefield yielded 99 NVA dead, 31 automatic and 7 crew-served weapons. For the 4/23rd’s outstanding performance, General William Westmoreland, Commander of the American Forces In Vietnam, personally wrote a congratulatory message, citing the Battalion’s courage and valor.

HHC Recon again found itself in the thick of intense fighting when on 26 April, they were attacked while setting up in a night defensive position. Despite suicidal human-wave attacks by the NVA, the men of Recon held their ground for hours until reinforcements arrived, and were credited with 150 NVA killed.

The 4th Battalion (Mechanized) 23rd Infantry continued its record of gallant combat service with the 25th Division until the Tropic Lightning left Vietnam in 1971. The battalion received two U.S. Army Valorous Unit Awards, two awards of the Republic of Vietnam Cross of Gallantry with Palm as well as the Republic of Vietnam Civic Action Honor Medal, 1st Class.

— Information on this page provided by Bill Kestell, Recon Platoon, 4th/23rd Infantry, and forwarded to us by Terry Landers.

Stryker Battalion
The 4th Battalion, 23rd Infantry was reactivated on 16 March 2004 at Fort Richardson, Alaska. The battalion was organized as a Stryker battalion and assigned to the 172nd Infantry Brigade (Stryker) and deployed in support of Operation Iraqi Freedom (OIF) from August 2005 to December 2006 for sixteen months.  The battalion was inactivated on 15 December 2006 and reactivated on 16 April 2007 as a Stryker infantry battalion at Fort Lewis, Washington and assigned to the 4th Brigade Combat Team (Stryker), 2nd Infantry Division.

Operation Iraqi Freedom 
In October 2003, as a part of 3-2 SBCT 1st Bn 23rd Infantry deployed from Fort Lewis to Kuwait and then to Iraq as part Operation Iraqi Freedom in the First Stryker Brigade.  1-23IN Deployed to FOB Pacesetter after one month of training in Kuwait.  The Battalion moved via ground to FOB Pacesetter under 4th Infantry Division where they conducted operations in Ad Deluiyah.  On 8 December B Co 1-23IN lost SPC Blickenstaff, SPC Wesley and SSG Bridges in a vehicle rollover on their first mission. The unit continued operations through the month of December as part of Operation Ivy Blizzard.  The Tomahawk Battalion then moved to Mosul, Iraq where the battalion conducted a relief in place with units from the 101st Airborne Division (Air Assault).  1-23IN occupied combat outpost on the western side of the Tigris River and conducted numerous combat operations to attempt to remove the insurgent threat in the Nineveh Province. The Battalion conducted numerous raids, traffic control points and neighborhood engagements to remove insurgents from the city.  All the while having the units history being chronicled by Colby Buzzell. Most notably the attack on 4 August 2004.  Where the entire battalion repelled and attack from a large coordinated citywide attack from insurgents.

Operation Enduring Freedom

Deployment and elections
Starting on 9 July 2009, 5-2 SBCT deployed from Fort Lewis, Washington to Kandahar Airfield, Afghanistan in support of Operation Enduring Freedom. After completing equipment preparation and troop-leading procedures, the battalion conducted a tactical road march to FOB (Forward Operating Base) Wolverine in Zabul Province on 5–6 August. Company A moved south of the Sur Ghar Mountains to FOB Sweeney, an outpost that was occupied by a USSF ODA and Afghan National Army Soldiers. They quickly settled into the area around the village of Shinkay and began counter-insurgency (COIN) operations. The next element to move out from Wolverine was Company C, which conducted a road march through Qalat to Shajoy, the second largest city in Zabul Province. Here they began the establishment of a company combat outpost that would be known as "Sangar", as well as the inception of COIN operations designed to provide security to the populace. Company B remained at FOB Wolverine with the battalion headquarters, and began conducting operations in Surri, a subdistrict of Shinkay.

Upon their arrival into sector, the battalion partnered with the Afghan National Army and Police Afghan National Security Forces (ANSF) and prepared for the Afghan National Election. Battalion personnel provided security at several polling stations in Zabul Province in order to ensure that the election was free and fair. The voting occurred without incident, much to the credit of the Soldiers and ANSF who worked to ensure that the Taliban could not intimidate voters. There was limited enemy contact throughout Ramadan, with the exception of Company C, who experienced a suicide attack in the Shajoy Bazaar which wounded 15 US soldiers and one interpreter. The first battalion mission planned was Operation 'Longview', which encompassed multiple clearing operations in Zabul Province; it was aimed at keeping the enemy from establishing a firm foothold in several key locations. Once Ramadan ended, the enemy became more aggressive, especially in Surri. Company B met the enemy several times in "the football", the area between Route Duck and Route Bull, this incident included the second in command of Taliban fighters in Zabul Province, Mohammad Khan. Khan set an ambush near the village of Mado, but was wounded in the fight and forced to flee. Intelligence reports later confirmed that Mohammad Khan had been killed in the engagement. The Taliban sought vengeance for their loss, and stepped up their attacks on coalition forces. On 24 September, members of Company B initiated a pressure plate improvised explosive device (IED) near the town of Omar Zai, killing three US soldiers and wounding three others. This incident led the battalion to adopt a more enemy-focused mission, and was the impetus behind Operation 'Laconia', the clearing of Omar Zai, Gazak Kalay, Bowlan Kalay, Patukheyl Kalay and Melizay Kalay. This operation, partnered with the ANA, led to the discovery of two IED caches and the disruption of the IED cell operating southwest of FOB Wolverine.

In October, as part of Operation 'Longview', Company A conducted Operation 'Treadstone': a partnered clearing of the Rowghani, Band Kalay, and Karim Khel areas north of Shinkay. Company C conducted Operation 'Chinehs': a battalion minus clearing of the Chinehs area north of Shajoy, known as the home of the shadow governor of Zabul. This mission yielded several IED caches, as well as the discovery of a madrassa where young men were trained to be suicide bombers. In November, 4th Battalion's (4-23 IN's) sister battalion, its Battalion, 17th Infantry (1-17 IN), suffered the loss of seven soldiers in an IED strike in the Arghandab River Valley in Kandahar Province. This incident led to the brigade minus mission Operation 'Focus Hold', where B Company, 4th Battalion (B/4-23) was ordered to move from FOB Wolverine to COP Jelawar in the southern Arghandab in order to assist 1-17 IN. Company C continued building COP "Sangar" and conducting patrols in Shajoy, until 19 November when a VBIED (car bomb), struck the joint ECP of COP "Sangar" and FOB Bullard, killing two paratroopers from the 1st Battalion, 508th Parachute Infantry (1-508th PIR). This led to the reestablishment of Operation 'Las Cruces': the tightened control of Shajoy City that occurred between 20–24 November, as well as the arrival of engineers and materials for the improvement of force protection on the COP.

While 4-23 IN soldiers ate Thanksgiving dinner at their bases, RC South was preparing a FRAGO for 5/2 SBCT. On 6 December, the brigade received a change of mission to stop COIN operations and focus on securing freedom of movement on the highways of southern Afghanistan. As part of this, 4-23 IN was to move out of Zabul Province and occupy bases in Helmand Province, in order to provide security on Highways 1 and 601. The battalion commander gave the order to consolidate all units at FOB Wolverine and prepare for movement. Company A was the first element to leave Zabul, moving into FOB Ramrod in the Maiwand District of Kandahar Province, alongside 2nd Battalion, 1st Infantry (2-1 IN). Personnel began the area assessments of their new AO along HWY 601 from Durai Junction to Lashkar Gah. Company B was released from 1-17 IN on 28 December and moved to FOB Tombstone, from which they would begin operations along Highway 1 west of the city of Gereshk.

The battalion headquarters and Company C were last to move, occupying FOB Price, a joint Danish, British and American base outside the city of Gereshk, in Helmand Province. The expansion of FOB Price required a large scale logistical move of building materials and life support equipment in order to establish the operations center, motor pool, ANA training academy, living areas, and security towers. FOB Price eventually grew to over twice its original size. Company C picked up its sector, responsible for Highway 1 between Gereshk and Durai Junction. Headquarters Company, which had previously owned battle space in Zabul, instead supervised the creation of the Mohawk Academy, which began the training of ANA soldiers in basic skills such as first aid and marksmanship.

Helmand Province

Upon arriving in Helmand Province, the battalion, partnered with 6/4/205 ANA and the Lashkar Gah ANP, executed Operation 'Helmand Sunrise', which focused on securing the highways by means of traffic control points, culvert denial emplacement, persistent surveillance, and training of the ANA and ANP along HWY 1 and HWY 601. During January, the 2nd Marine Expeditionary Brigade and RC South planned Operation Moshtarak, the clearing of the known Taliban stronghold in central Helmand Province known as Marjeh. 4-23 IN was chosen to participate in this operation. The battalion leadership met Marine commanders at FOB Dwyer as early as 20 January to plan for the clearing of Marjeh, specifically focusing on the battalion's role in clearing the Badula Qulp area along the Trekh Zabur Canal, which would be known as Operation 'Helmand Spider'. 5/2 SBCT would attach A/1-17 IN to 4-23 IN for the operation, while B/1-17 IN would occupy FOB Tombstone and pick up operations in the B/4-23 IN sector while they were participating in Operation 'Moshtarak', as a continued presence on the highways was deemed critical to mission success. Operation 'Helmand Spider' began on 8 February and lasted for 26 days. Task Force Mohawk, partnered with 1/1/205 ANA, cleared south along the Trekh Zabur Canal, conducting a link up with 3/6 Marines at the "5 points" intersection in southern Nad-e Ali District. Following this, A/1-17 IN and B/4-23 IN pushed west into northern Marjeh to conduct disruption operations, while the Reconnaissance Platoon conducted screening along the northern corridor in order to prevent the infiltration of Taliban reinforcements. Task Force Mohawk continued operations until 6 March, when they were relieved by elements of 3/6 Marines.

In the month long operation, the task force had 15 enemy KIA, 9 enemy WIA, 23 IEDs found and cleared, 8 IED strikes, and 497 individuals enrolled in biometric systems. 4-23 IN and its supporting elements were recommended by Task Force Leatherneck for a Presidential Unit Citation for their actions in Marjeh. During February, several smaller company operations were conducted along HWY 601 and in the Yakhchal valley. Company A conducted Operation '601 Cougar', clearing north through Gavban in the southern Yakhchal, which yielded a great amount of intelligence about the enemy in the area. Company C conducted missions in Mohammad Karim Kalay, as well as Yakhchal, in order to disrupt enemy forces influencing HWY 1. Throughout the remainder of the deployment, 4-23 IN continued to provide freedom of movement along the highways, while simultaneously planning to hand over their vehicles and equipment to the 2nd Stryker Cavalry Regiment and hand over the Helmand battlespace to the 2nd Marine Expeditionary Brigade and the Danish battlegroup. The final battalion operation was the move back to Zabul Province in order to set up operations for the 2nd Stryker Cavalry Regiment to assume responsibility.

Return to U.S.
4-23 Infantry returned to Fort Lewis in July 2010 following its 12-month deployment. The battalion was part of the first Stryker unit to deploy to Afghanistan. 4-23 Infantry was the only Stryker battalion operating in the remote, mountainous terrain of Zabul Province, which required greater logistical coordination, maintenance, and care of equipment than any other unit. The battalion was the only infantry unit in Afghanistan to be tasked to move across two provinces and set up operations in an entirely new area. 4-23 Infantry was the only U.S. Army unit to take part in Operation 'Moshtarak', the largest offensive operation in Afghanistan since the war began in 2001. 4-23 Infantry was also the only U.S. Army infantry battalion operating in the volatile Helmand Province. 4-23 Infantry as part of 5th Stryker Brigade, 2nd Infantry Division was the second U.S. Army brigade to deploy with the Landwarrior system.

Afghanistan 2012 Deployment
4-23 Infantry deployed in April 2012 under the reflagged 2nd Stryker Brigade, known as the Lancers, 2nd Infantry Division to the Maiwand and Zharai District and returned to Joint Base Lewis-McChord in January 2013.

1-23 Infantry deployed in March 2012, 3rd Stryker brigade combat team, to Panjwai district, Kandahar province, Afghanistan. The Taliban proclaimed Panjwai as the birthplace of the Taliban movement in the early 1990s.  1-64 Armor deployed and was attached to 1-23 Infantry throughout their deployment.

History
Constituted 3 May 1861 in the Regular Army as the 1st Battalion, 14th Infantry
Organized 8 July 1861 at Fort Trumbull, Connecticut
Redesignated 30 April 1862 as the 2nd Battalion, 14th Infantry
Reorganized and redesignated 21 September 1866 as the 23rd Infantry
Assigned 22 September 1917 to the 2nd Division (later redesignated as the 2nd Infantry Division)
Assigned 20 October 1954, to Fort Lewis, WA
Assigned 1956, to Alaska
Relieved 20 June 1957 from assignment to the 2nd Infantry Division and reorganized as a parent regiment under the Combat Arms Regimental System (CARS). 
Redesignated 20 June 1957 1st Battalion becomes Headquarters and Headquarters Company, 1st Battle Group, 23rd Infantry
Redesignated 20 June 1957, Company 'D' becomes Headquarters and Headquarters Company, 4th Battle Group, 23rd Infantry (inactive)
Redesignated 1963 Company F, 1st Battle Group, 23rd Infantry organized as Airborne infantry, earning nickname "Fearless Foxes"
Redesignated 25 January 1963 1st Battle Group, 23rd Infantry becomes 1st Battalion, 23rd Infantry
Assigned 25 January 1963 1st Battalion, 23rd Infantry to 2nd Infantry Division.
Activated 25 January 1963 4th Battle Group, 23rd Infantry 
Assigned 25 January 1963 4th Battle Group, 23rd Infantry to 172nd Infantry Brigade
Redesignated 1 July 1963 the 4th Battle Group, 23rd Infantry becomes 4th Battalion, 23rd Infantry
Reflagged 1 July 1963 Co F (Abn) to Co (Abn), 4-23rd Infantry at Ft. Richardson, Alaska
Transferred 1 July 1965, 1st Battalion, 23rd Infantry to South Korea
Alerted 17 December 1965, the 4th Battalion (Mechanized), 23rd Infantry for overseas deployment
Assigned 14 January 1966 4th Battalion, 23rd Infantry to 1st Brigade, 25th Infantry Division
Activated 14 January 1966 5th Battalion, 23rd Infantry and assigned to 172nd Inf Bde (Separate)
Embarked 15 April 1966 4th Battalion, 23rd Infantry on USS Walker
Sailed 16 April 1966 USS Walker at 0200 With 4-23rd Infantry
Arrived 29 April 1966 Vung Tau, and assigned to Chu Chi, Republic of Vietnam
Inactivated 5 June 1972 4-23rd Infantry from 25th Infantry Division 
Reactivated 2 August 1972 4-23rd Infantry and reassigned to the 172nd Infantry Brigade in Alaska 
Inactivated 2 August 1972 5th Battalion, 23rd Infantry
Inactivated 6 January 1983 4th Battalion, 23rd Infantry
Reactivated 21 January 1983 4th Battalion, 23rd Infantry
Assigned 21 January 1983 4th Battalion, 23rd Infantry to 9th Infantry Division (Motorized), Fort Lewis, WA
Assigned 21 January 1983 2nd Battalion, 23rd Infantry to 9th Infantry Division (Motorized), Fort Lewis, WA
Withdrawn 21 January 1983 All infantry from the Combat Arms Regimental System and reorganized under the United States Army Regimental System
Inactivated on 16 December 1986 1st Battalion, 23rd Infantry, 2nd Brigade, 2nd Infantry Division, South Korea
Inactivated 28 September 1990 4th Battalion, 23rd Infantry
Inactivated 28 September 1990 2nd Battalion, 23rd Infantry relieved from assignment to the 9th Infantry Division
Reactivated 16 April 1995 1st Battalion, 23rd Infantry
Assigned 16 April 1995 1st Battalion, 23rd Infantry to Fort Lewis
Reassigned 2003 1st Battalion, 23rd Infantry Fort Lewis, WA, and became part of the 3rd Brigade, 2nd Infantry Division, the first Stryker brigade
Reactivated 16 March 2004 4th Battalion, 23d Infantry; reorganized as a Stryker battalion  
Assigned 16 March 2004 4th Battalion, 23rd Infantry to 172nd Infantry Brigade (Stryker)
Inactivated 15 December 2006 4th Battalion (Stryker), 23rd Infantry 
Activated 16 April 2007 4th Battalion (Stryker), 23rd Infantry 
Assigned 16 April 2007 5th Brigade Combat Team (Stryker), 2nd Infantry Division

 2003-2004 Served in OIF (1st Battalion with 3rd BCT, 2nd Inf Div)
 2005-2006 Served in OIF (4th Battalion with 172d INF BDE)
 2006-2007 Served in OIF (1st Battalion with 3rd BCT, 2nd Inf Div)
 2007-2008 Served in OIF "Surge" (2nd Battalion with 4th BCT, 2nd Inf Div)
 2009-2010 Served in OIF (1st Battalion with 3rd BCT, 2nd Inf Div)
 2009-2010 Served in OIF (2nd Battalion with 4th BCT, 2d Inf Div)
 2009-2010 Served in OEF (4th Battalion, 5th BCT, 2nd Inf Div later reassigned to the 2nd BCT, 2nd Inf Div)
 2012-2013 Served in OEF (1st, 2nd, 4th Battalion with 2nd BCT, 2nd Inf Div, 3rd BCT, 2nd Inf Div, and 4th BCT, 2nd Inf Div)
 2018-2019 Served in Operation Freedom's Sentinel (2nd Battalion with 1st SBCT, 4th Inf Div)

Current structure
 1st Battalion, 1st SBCT, 2nd Infantry Division, Fort Lewis, Washington
 2nd Battalion, 1st SBCT, 4th Infantry Division, Fort Carson, Colorado 
 4th Battalion, 2nd SBCT, 2nd Infantry Division, Fort Lewis, Washington

Campaign participation credit
American Civil War: Peninsula; Manassas; Antietam; Fredericksburg; Chancellorsville; Gettysburg; Wilderness; Spotsylvania; Cold Harbor; Petersburg; Virginia 1862; Virginia 1863
Indian Wars: Little Big Horn; Arizona 1866; Idaho 1868;
Spanish–American War: Manila
Philippine–American War: Manila; Malolos; Mindanao; Jolo; Jolo 1903
World War I: Aisne; Aisne-Marne; St. Mihiel; Meuse-Argonne; Ile de France 1918; Lorraine 1918
World War II: Normandy; Northern France; Rhineland; Ardennes-Alsace; Central Europe
Korean War: UN Defensive; UN Offensive; CCF Intervention; First UN Counteroffensive; CCF Spring Offensive; UN Summer-Fall Offensive; Second Korean Winter; Korea, Summer/Fall 1952; Third Korean Winter; Korea, Summer 1953
Vietnam War: Counteroffensive; Counteroffensive, Phase II; Counteroffensive, Phase III; Tet Counteroffensive; Counteroffensive, Phase IV; Counteroffensive, Phase V; Counteroffensive, Phase VI; Tet 69/Counteroffensive; Summer/Fall 1969; Winter-Spring 1970; Sanctuary Counteroffensive; Counteroffensive, Phase VII
Operation 'Iraqi Freedom', Nov 2003-Dec 2004 (1st Battalion): Samarra; Tal Afar; and Mosul; Al Kutt; Al Hayy; Al Suwaria; Yousifiah
Operation 'Iraqi Freedom', Aug 2005-Dec 2006: Mosul; Rawah; Tal Afar; Baghdad
Operation 'Iraqi Freedom', Jun 2006-Sep 2007: (1st Battalion): Baghdad "Arrowhead Ripper"; The Surge; Baqubah (Jun/Sep 2007)
Operation 'Iraqi Freedom', Apr 2007-Jun 2008 (2nd Battalion): The Surge; Baghdad and Diyala Province
Operation 'Iraqi Freedom', Jul 2009-Aug 2010 (1st Battalion): Drawdown; Diyala Province; Baqubah
Operation 'Iraqi Freedom', Sep 2009-Sep 2010 (2nd Battalion): Drawdown; Baghdad; Al Taji;
Operation 'Enduring Freedom':  OEF 09-11 (4th Battalion)
Operation 'Enduring Freedom':  OEF 11-12 (1st Battalion)
Operation 'Enduring Freedom':  OEF 12-13 (4th Battalion)
Operation 'Freedom's Sentinel', Apr 2018-Jan 2019 (2nd Battalion)

Decorations
Presidential Unit Citation (Army) for BREST, FRANCE
Presidential Unit Citation (Army) for WIRTZFELD, BELGIUM
Presidential Unit Citation (Army) for KRINKELTER WALD, BELGIUM
Presidential Unit Citation (Army) for ST. VITH
Presidential Unit Citation (Army) for TWIN TUNNELS
Presidential Unit Citation (Army) for CHIPYONG-NI
Presidential Unit Citation (Army) for HONGCHON
Valorous Unit Award for SAIGON
Valorous Unit Award for TAY NINH PROVINCE
Republic of Vietnam Cross of Gallantry with Palm for VIETNAM 1966-1968 (4th battalion)
Republic of Vietnam Cross of Gallantry with Palm for VIETNAM 1968-1970 (4th battalion)
Republic of Vietnam Civil Action Honor Medal, First Class for VIETNAM 1966-1970 (4th battalion)
French Croix de Guerre with Palm, World War I for CHATEAU THIERRY
French Croix de Guerre with Palm, World War I for AISNE-MARNE
French Croix de Guerre with Palm, World War I for MEUSE-ARGONNE
French Croix de Guerre, World War I, Fourragere
Belgian Fourragere 1940
Cited in the Order of the Day of the Belgian Army for action in the Ardennes
Cited in the Order of the Day of the Belgian Army for action at Elsenborn Crest
Republic of Korea Presidential Unit Citation for NAKTONG RIVER LINE
Republic of Korea Presidential Unit Citation for KOREA 1950-1953
Republic of Korea Presidential Unit Citation for KOREA 1952-1953
Meritorious Unit Citation (1st Battalion) for Operation Iraqi Freedom in Mosul, tal afar, Samarra and al kut (November 2003 - November 2004 - Baghdad (June 2006 - September 2007))
Meritorious Unit Citation (2nd Battalion) for Operation Iraqi Freedom in Baghdad and Diyala Province (April 2007 – June 2008)
Presidential Unit Citation (2nd Battalion) for Operation Iraqi Freedom In Baghdad and Diyala Province (August 2009 - 2010)
Valorous Unit Award (1st Battalion) for action in Baquabah as part of Operation Arrowhead Ripper
Presidential ww.army.mil/article/76990/JBLM_units_receive_Navy_Presidential_Unit_Citation/
Valorous Unit Award (4th Battalion) for RC South, Afghanistan (April 2012 – January 2013)
Meritorious Unit Citation (2nd Battalion) for Operation Freedom's Sentinel in Nangarhar, Herat, and Kabul Province (April 2018 - January 2019)

See also

Wikimedia Commons: 23rd Infantry Regiment Heraldry
The 'Nam

Notes

References
 The 23rd Infantry Regiment, 1866-1957 
 The Twenty Third United States Infantry, 1812-1945

External links
Official Regiment Website

Military units and formations of the United States in the Indian Wars
0023
1861 establishments in the United States
United States Army units and formations in the Korean War
Military units and formations established in 1861
American military units and formations of the War of 1812